Liwa or Liva is a river in northern Poland and a tributary of the Nogat. The largest tributary of the Liwa is the Palemon Canal. In the upper reaches of the river there are numerous hydropower plants. The total length of the river is 118,5 km while the biggest city on the Liwa is Kwidzyn.

See also
 Rivers of Poland

1Liwa
Rivers of Poland
Rivers of Pomeranian Voivodeship
Rivers of Warmian-Masurian Voivodeship